Anderson Conceição Benedito (born 24 October 1989), known as Anderson Conceição, is a Brazilian footballer who plays as a centre back for Vasco da Gama.

Career
Conceição joined Tombense Futebol Clube in June 2011, but has spent the majority of his tenure on various loan spells at larger clubs.

During the 2012-2013 season, Conceição played for La Liga's RCD Mallorca, appearing in 19 matches in all competitions including two matches in the Copa del Rey.

In 2015, Conceição played for América Mineiro, where he appeared in 30 matches while helping the team achieve promotion to Série A for the 2016 season.

Philadelphia Union
On 13 January 2016, Conceição was loaned to the Philadelphia Union on a season-long loan.

Honours
Cuiabá
Campeonato Mato-Grossense: 2021

References

External links
 
 
 

1989 births
Living people
Sportspeople from Bahia
Brazilian footballers
Campeonato Brasileiro Série A players
Campeonato Brasileiro Série B players
Mogi Mirim Esporte Clube players
Resende Futebol Clube players
Criciúma Esporte Clube players
Figueirense FC players
Atlético Clube Goianiense players
Esporte Clube Bahia players
Joinville Esporte Clube players
La Liga players
RCD Mallorca players
Brazilian expatriate footballers
Expatriate footballers in Portugal
Brazilian expatriate sportspeople in Portugal
Expatriate footballers in Spain
Brazilian expatriate sportspeople in Spain
Expatriate soccer players in the United States
Brazilian expatriate sportspeople in the United States
Brazilian expatriate sportspeople in Qatar
Expatriate footballers in Qatar
Qatar Stars League players
Umm Salal SC players
Cuiabá Esporte Clube players
CR Vasco da Gama players
Philadelphia Union players
Philadelphia Union II players
Major League Soccer players
Association football central defenders
USL Championship players